Rhacophorus georgii (common name: Tuwa flying frog) is a species of flying frog in the family Rhacophoridae endemic to Sulawesi, Indonesia. Its type locality ("Tuwa, Paluthal, West-Central Celebes") cannot be located, but it has recently been collected from Buton, off southeastern Sulawesi.

Rhacophorus georgii live in lowland forests, below  asl. These frogs attach foamy egg masses to the trunks of trees, 1–3 cm above water-filled tree cavities; each female can carry 29–108 eggs. Upon hatching, tadpoles fall to these water-filled cavities.

Specific threats to this species are unknown but it is probably negatively affected by habitat loss.

References

georgii
Endemic fauna of Indonesia
Amphibians of Sulawesi
Taxa named by Jean Roux
Taxonomy articles created by Polbot
Amphibians described in 1904